Wynonna Earp is a supernatural Western horror  television series. Developed by Emily Andras, the Canadian-American program is based on the comic book series by Beau Smith. Melanie Scrofano plays the titular character, the great-great-granddaughter of legendary lawman Wyatt Earp.  In the series, Wynonna returns to her hometown of Purgatory, near the Canadian Rockies, where she battles revenants, the reincarnated outlaws that Wyatt killed.

Syfy acquired United States rights for Wynonna Earp and ordered a 13-episode season in 2015, premiering it on April 1, 2016. The series premiered in Canada on CHCH-DT on April 4. Viacom International Media Networks acquired the rights to broadcast Wynonna Earp on its multinational Spike channels in July 2016. Three seasons have since aired and filming for a fourth season began in 2020 before being suspended due to the COVID-19 pandemic. Season 4 premiered on Syfy and CTV Sci-Fi Channel on July 26, 2020. On February 5, 2021, Syfy announced that the fourth season would be the last, with the remaining episodes starting on March 5, 2021. The series, however, was not officially cancelled by CTV Sci-Fi Channel.

Critical response to the series was positive. E! Entertainment Television named Wynonna Earp the "Best New Show" of 2016. It was chosen by Variety as one of the 20 best new series of 2016. In its annual "Best of TV" highlight, Collider named Wynonna Earp the "Best New Sci-Fi" show of 2016. Maureen Ryan of Variety named Wynonna Earp one of the best television shows of 2017.

Plot

On her 27th birthday, Wynonna Earp, the great-great-granddaughter of legendary lawman Wyatt Earp, inherits the special power to return revenants, the reincarnated outlaws that Wyatt had killed, back to Hell. Using her ancestor's magic gun, "Peacemaker," Wynonna works to break her family's curse by sending demons back where they belong. She also fights other supernatural beings that inhabit the Ghost River Triangle, a cursed territory near the Canadian Rockies that includes Purgatory, her hometown. After being recruited by the Black Badge Division (BBD), a secret government agency led by Special Agent Xavier Dolls, she is joined by an ageless Doc Holliday and Wynonna's sister, Waverly Earp. Nicole Haught, a Purgatory Sheriff's Deputy and Waverly's girlfriend, assists the team in her local police role.

The first season centers on Wynonna fighting the revenants who kidnapped her older sister Willa from their homestead when they were girls, and the threat posed by Bobo Del Rey, leader of the local revenants. In the second season Wynonna discovers she is pregnant, while Waverly struggles with possession by a demon and doubts about her lineage. At the same time, two sister-wife widows of the dead sheriff who cursed Wyatt Earp seek to resurrect him. In season 3, the demon Clootie is resurrected and, as he seeks to find the entrance to the Garden of Eden, the team must work to stop him and prevent the resulting apocalypse.  In season 4 part 1, Wynonna and Nicole must figure out a way to rescue Doc and Waverly, with the help of a new friend.  In the Garden, Doc and Waverly deal with an imposter.  Once rescued, Wynonna, Doc and Waverly return to find out that they have been gone longer than expected.  While Waverly tries to help Nicole get past the trauma of their time apart, Wynonna searches for Peacemaker.  And they must rescue one of their own from Wyatt's greatest enemies.  In season 4 part 2, the gang celebrate Wayhaught engagement.  Doc and Wynonna aren't on good terms whilst the latter's drinking gets worse.  The gang deal with a cupid, jack-o'-lantern, genie, mysterious fog, Jolene, Cleo and the BBD.

Episodes

Cast and characters

Main

 Melanie Scrofano as Wynonna Earp, a great-great-granddaughter of Wyatt Earp, who wields the power of Wyatt's "Peacemaker" handgun. She conceived a baby with Doc Holliday, and in the season 2 finale their newborn daughter, Alice, is smuggled out of the Ghost River Triangle to keep her safe. When the Earp curse was broken by Bulshar in the season three finale, Wynonna stopped being the heir.
 Shamier Anderson as Deputy Marshal Xavier Dolls, a special agent with the Black Badge division of the United States Marshals Service, a combustible mutant lizard-man generated by Black Badge. Knowing that he was dying from the drugs Black Badge had given him, he sacrifices himself to save the team (seasons 1–3).
 Tim Rozon as Doc Holliday, Wyatt Earp's famed partner, cursed with eternal health by the Stone Witch who cured his tuberculosis. He has a daughter with Wynonna, Alice Michelle.
 Dominique Provost-Chalkley as Waverly Earp, Wynonna's younger half-sister, who was fathered by an angel named Julian and inherited supernatural powers from him. She is an expert on Earp and ancient history and languages. In season one she questions her sexuality after dumping her boyfriend Champ. After kissing Nicole Haught, she accepts her bisexuality and becomes Nicole's girlfriend. She is about to propose to Nicole in season 3, but is unintentionally interrupted by Wynonna; and does it again in season 4 in the presence of her sister and their friends, with Nicole accepting the proposal. They got married in the Season 4 finale.
 Katherine Barrell as Officer Nicole Haught, an open lesbian and deputy sheriff of Ghost River County who becomes Waverly's girlfriend and collaborates with Black Badge. She is promoted to sheriff in season 3. Nicole lost her position as sheriff in season 4 when Wynonna, Doc, and Waverly were temporarily gone from Purgatory for over one year, and she protected the Earp homestead during their absence. She was hexed by the Swamp Witch for not upholding her part of their bargain after the three returned. The spell is broken and she accepts Waverly's marriage proposal. Later she realized, that she misses her job and after an emotional speech in Shorty's, she got her position as sheriff back after the residents from Purgatory agreed that they needed her. She married Waverly in the Season 4 finale. (main seasons 3–4;  recurring seasons 1–3 [episodes 3.01, 3.02]).

Recurring

 Greg Lawson as Sheriff Randy Nedley, the sheriff of Ghost River County who is aware of Purgatory's supernatural nature. He retires from his position and is succeeded by Nicole Haught in season 3; thereafter helping Wynonna when she needs him in her fight against demons (First appearance: "Purgatory").
 Michael Eklund as Bobo Del Rey (born Robert Svane), leader of the revenants and former friend of Wyatt Earp. Before dying, he became Waverly's sworn protector. Bobo is executed by Wynonna in the season 1 finale but unexpectedly revived in season 2. Somewhat of an enigma, Bobo is finally killed by Waverly (First appearance: "Keep the Home Fires Burning"; seasons 1–3).
 Rayisa Kondracki as Constance Clootie, also known as the Stone Witch. One of Bulshar's three wives, she cursed Doc Holliday with eternal life before entrapping him in a well. She had two nonhuman sons whom she tried to resurrect (First appearance: "Diggin' Up Bones"; seasons 1–3). Jessica Sipos portrays a young Constance Clootie in flashbacks, in "No Future in the Past" (season 2) and "Waiting Forever for You" (season 3).  
 Kate Drummond as Agent Lucado, Dolls' superior officer at Black Badge. Killed by a demon (First appearance: "Walking After Midnight"; seasons 1–2).
 Natalie Krill as Willa Earp (aka Eve), Wynonna and Waverly's older sister, also able to wield the power of Wyatt's "Peacemaker". Mercy-killed by Wynonna in the Season 1 finale. (First appearance: "She Wouldn't Be Gone"; season 1).
 Shaun Johnston as Juan Carlo, Purgatory's parish priest in the 1880s. He is mercy-killed by Dolls in season 2 after being fatally wounded by The Widows. In season 3 he is revealed to have been an angel and, along with Julian, charged with protecting the entrance to the Garden of Eden in the Ghost River Triangle (First appearance: "Landslide"; seasons 1–3).
 Varun Saranga as Jeremy Chetri, a Black Badge Division scientist who helps the Earps against their BBD blood contract. When he was young, he was trapped in a car for three days with his dead mother, and can sense when his friends are scared. In season 3, a fire witch detected that Jeremy was not completely human (First appearance: "Steel Bars and Stone Walls"; seasons 2–4).
 Tamara Duarte as Rosita Bustillos, a revenant and Doc's girlfriend with advanced degrees in biochemistry and engineering whom he recruits to assist the team. She betrays them and flees in the season 2 finale (First appearance: "Shed Your Skin"; seasons 2, 4).
 Dani Kind as Mercedes Gardner, Wynonna's rich high-school best friend, head of the Gardner Family and its purse strings, but disliked by her siblings Beth and Tucker. Along with her sister Beth, her face is stolen by demonic widow spiders (The Widows), leaving human Mercedes comatose. The possessing Widow is executed by Wynonna in the season 2 finale. Mercedes is revived but left with a scarred face, which was suddenly healed after Waverly touched her cheek, not knowing that she had demi-angel powers (First appearance: "Shed Your Skin"; seasons 2–4).
 Caleb Ellsworth-Clark as Tucker Gardner, younger brother of the Gardner sisters and local miscreant, who has an unhealthy obsession with Waverly. He is killed by the Widow possessing Beth Gardner. (First appearance: "Gonna Getcha Good"; season 2).
 Meghan Heffern as Beth Gardner, the younger of the two Gardner sisters. Along with her sister Mercedes, her face is stolen by demonic widow spiders (The Widows), killing human Beth. Widow Beth is executed by Wynonna in the season 2 finale (First appearance: "Gonna Getcha Good"; season 2).
 Megan Follows as Michelle Gibson Earp, mother of the Earp sisters. Michelle was a voluntary patient in the Ghost River Institute, a high-security psychiatric facility until she escaped in season 3 (First appearance: "Blood Red And Going Down"; season 3). Brooke McCann portrays a young Michelle Gibson.
 Chantel Riley as Kate (Katalin) aka  "Contessa", wife of Doc Holliday since the 1880s. Kate was turned into a vampire after Doc's disappearance, and returned to Purgatory when she found out he was alive (First appearance: "Blood Red And Going Down"; seasons 3–4).
 Jean Marchand as Bulshar Clootie, sheriff of Purgatory when Wyatt Earp was the federal marshall in the territory.  He was entombed by Juan Carlo and Robert Svane (Bobo), and resuscitated by The Widows. An Earp family adversary, Bulshar is revealed to be the embodiment of the serpent from the Garden of Eden and aims to bring on an apocalypse during Wynonna's time (First appearance: "Blood Red And Going Down"; season 3).
 Sebastian Pigott as Charlie/ Julian. An angel assigned to protect the Garden of Eden together with Juan Carlo. He fathered Waverly during his love affair with Michelle Gibson Earp. At some point he loses his memory and reinvents himself as Charlie, a fireman who dates Wynonna. His real identity is revealed after Waverly restores his memories with his ring (First appearance: "If We Make It Through December"; season 3).
 Justin Kelly as Robin Jett, Waverly's high school friend who comes back to town to help out his sick father. A jazz historian, he is kidnapped by Bulshar soon after his first appearance. He later becomes Jeremy's boyfriend. (First appearance: "No Cure For Crazy"; season 3).
The role was recast with Jim Watson in the fourth season (First appearance: "Hell Raisin' Good Time"; season 4).
 Martina Ortiz-Luis as Rachel Valdez. Teenager who is looked after by Nicole whilst Wynonna, Waverly and Doc are in the Garden (First appearance: "On the Road Again"; season 4).
 Noam Jenkins as Amon, an enigmatic demon who opens a bar for demonfolk while Wynonna, Waverly and Doc were trapped in the Garden (First appearance: "Look at Them Beans"; season 4).

Episodes of season 1 featured Dylan Koroll as Champ Hardy, Waverly's boyfriend before she met Officer Nicole Haught; Natascha Girgis as Gus McCready, aunt of the Earp girls; and David LeReaney as Judge Cryderman, an antagonist of Wynonna Earp. In season 1 Rachael Ancheril appeared as Mattie Perley, a witch known as The Blacksmith, who provided assistance to the Earps; in season 2 Ancheril appeared as Gretta Perley, also known as The Iron Witch, who was seeking revenge against the Earps whom she blames for the death of her twin sister Mattie.

Development and production
Syfy acquired the U.S. rights to Wynonna Earp from SEVEN24 Films and IDW Entertainment in July 2015 and placed an order for 13 episodes. International distribution of the series was acquired by Dynamic Television in September 2015. On September 30, 2015, SEVEN24 Films announced the acquisition of Canadian broadcast rights by over-the-air independent station CHCH-DT. CHCH procured the funding to broadcast Season 1 from global content investment and rights management company Motion Content Group.

Melanie Scrofano was cast in the title role, with Tim Rozon as Doc Holliday and Shamier Anderson as Agent Dolls. Dominique Provost-Chalkley was cast as Waverly Earp. In recurring roles, Michael Eklund was cast as villain Bobo Del Rey and Katherine Barrell as Officer Nicole Haught.

"Tell That Devil" by singer-songwriter Jill Andrews was selected as the theme music for the series. The titles of Wynonna Earp episodes are based on country and western songs.

Viacom International Media Networks acquired the rights to broadcast Wynonna Earp on its multinational Spike channels in July 2016. In March 2017, Bell Media announced the new partnership between Space and SEVEN24 Films as Canadian co-producers of the series. In 2019, Cineflix Studios joined the series as a co-producer and Cineflix Rights became the international rights agent for all seasons of Wynonna Earp. Later that year, in September, Space Channel became the CTV Sci-Fi Channel.

Season 1
Filming of Season 1 took place from September 14, 2015, to February 12, 2016, in Calgary, Alberta, Canada. Locations included Bridgeland, Inglewood, and Heritage Park. Didsbury, Alberta, was used as the setting for the series' small town of Purgatory.

Syfy released the first promotional images and synopsis for the series on November 6, 2015. The teaser trailer was released through IGN in January 2016.

Wynonna Earp premiered on April 1, 2016, on Syfy; and on April 4, 2016, on CHCH-DT.

Season 2
On July 23, 2016, the renewal for a second season was announced at the Wynonna Earp panel at San Diego Comic-Con (SDCC). In Canada, Wynonna Earp moved from CHCH-DT to Space effective April 15, 2017. In anticipation of the premiere of Season 2, Space began airing Season 1 on the same date with a special double-episode series debut.

After the series was renewed for a second season, Melanie Scrofano found out that she was pregnant. Emily Andras decided to incorporate her pregnancy in the arc of the titular character, she informed IDW Entertainment of the prospective storyline, and Syfy added two more episodes, increasing Season 2 from 10 to 12 episodes.

Season 2 began filming in Calgary and surrounding areas from December 12, 2016, to April 13, 2017. Additional location shooting took place in Springbank, Alberta. The recurring cast was joined by Varun Saranga in the role of Jeremy Chetri and Tamara Duarte as Rosita.

The 'sneak peek' of the teaser trailer for the new season was released on April 1, 2017, and the trailer released officially by IGN on May 19, 2017. Syfy released the poster for the season on May 24, 2017.

Season 2 premiered on June 9, 2017, on Syfy and Space.

Season 3
On July 22, 2017, David Ozer, president of IDW Entertainment, announced at the show's SDCC panel that the series had been renewed for a third season with the premiere scheduled for 2018. Space announced on the same day that it had ordered 12 episodes for a third season, together with Syfy. Andras credited Wynonna Earp'''s passionate fan base (nicknamed "Earpers") with gaining the renewal.

Filming of Season 3 began January 15, 2018, and wrapped on May 7, 2018. On February 5, 2018, the series announced the casting of Megan Follows in the role of Michelle Earp, the mother of Wynonna Earp.

In March 2018, Syfy and Space announced that Zoie Palmer had joined the series as a guest star in the role of Jolene; followed by the announcement that Chantel Riley had been cast in the recurring role of a bounty hunter character named Kate. Bell Media announced on April 24 that musician Jann Arden had joined the cast as Bunny Loblaw, a member of Purgatory's town council.

The key art for the season was released on June 5, 2018, along with photos of the cast. Syfy's trailer for the third season was released on June 8, 2018. Space released its trailer on June 15, 2018. The episode titles were released on June 19, 2018.

Season 3 premiered on July 20, 2018, on Syfy and Space. The first episode of the season was released as a special broadcast by Syfy on July 16, 2018, at 11 p.m. Eastern, in advance of the season premiere.

Season 4
On July 21, 2018, the renewal by Syfy and Space (rebranded as CTV Sci-Fi Channel in 2019) for a fourth season was announced at SDCC. The season was scheduled to premiere in 2019 and comprise 12 episodes.

In late February 2019, news broke that the start of production on the fourth season had been delayed due to financial problems at IDW Entertainment. On July 2, 2019, it was announced that production would begin in late 2019 and filming starting January 2020, with Cineflix Studios as co-producer, and Canada's Crave network as a new production partner. Emily Andras thanked fans of Wynonna Earp for their loyalty, "This is an enormous testament to our passionate and fierce fans, the Earpers, who remind us every day how to fight like hell for the things you love with wit, ferocity and kindness." Andras and cast were slated to appear at the 2019 San Diego Comic-Con.

Filming for Season 4 began in Calgary on January 15, 2020. New cast joining the series in the fourth season include Martina Ortiz-Luis as Rachel, Andrew Phung, and Ty Olsson. Production was temporarily suspended on March 16 after Alberta issued a provincial order to stop all television and film productions due to concerns over the spread of coronavirus in the region and Canada.

The trailer for the fourth season was released on June 26, 2020. The key art for the new season was decided in a Syfy fan contest held in June 2020, with Emily Andras selecting the winning design announced on July 17, 2020.

On June 26, 2020, the series and Bell Media announced the premiere of the first six episodes of Season 4 on July 26. Filming on the remaining episodes resumed on July 16, 2020.

On February 5, 2021, SyFy announced that it had cancelled the series, with the second half of the season returning on March 5. In her statement about the decision, Emily Andras said, "I have been honored to tell Wynonna and her family's story, and along with Seven24, Cineflix and CTV Sci-Fi, are hopeful we can continue to share their inspiring tales in the future."

Although the series was cancelled on Syfy, Eric Volmers of the Calgary Herald reported that Seven24 Films was "in discussions with American broadcasters" and hoped to "keep this remarkable show going", while fans of the series had mounted an international campaign for a fifth season.

Release
BroadcastWynonna Earp premiered in the United Kingdom on Spike on July 29, 2016, at 9:00 p.m. The series premiered in Australia on Spike on February 5, 2017.

In the UK, Season 2 premiered on Spike on June 13, 2017, at 10:00 p.m. Season 3 premiered on 5Spike on July 27, 2018, at 10:00 p.m.

The series is distributed internationally on Netflix.

Home mediaWynonna Earp became available on Amazon Video as video on demand on May 6, 2016.

In December 2016, SEVEN24 Films producer Jordy Randall announced in an interview with the Calgary Herald that Season 1 would be streaming on Netflix. The series became available on Netflix in the United States on April 1, 2017; and in Canada on April 5, 2017.

The Season 1 DVD for Region 4 and Blu-ray for Region B were released first in Australia by Roadshow Entertainment on May 3, 2017.

The Season 2 DVD was released in Region 4 and the Blu-ray in Region B by Roadshow Entertainment on November 1, 2017.

A crowdfunding campaign for a region free Blu-ray release was launched on May 23, 2017, by IDW Entertainment on Indiegogo.

Reception
In the United States, season 1 averaged a total rating of 0.13 with 0.56 million viewers. The season received a 79% approval rating on review aggregator Rotten Tomatoes based on 14 reviews, with an average rating of 6.11/10. The critical consensus states: "What Wynonna Earp lacks in originality it more than makes up for in gritty, silly, supernatural fun." Metacritic gave it an average score of 68 out of 100.

Season 2 averaged a 0.12 rating in the U.S. with 0.50 million viewers. Viewership among women aged 18–34 increased 44 percent, representing more than half of Wynonna Earps  audience. The season received a 100% approval rating on Rotten Tomatoes based on 15 reviews, with an average rating of 8.33/10. The critical consensus states: "Wynonna Earp ups the ante with more action, more surprises, and more Melanie Scrofano as the titular sharp-tongued gunslinger."

In the U.S., season 3 averaged a rating of 0.11 with 0.47 million viewers. The season received a 100% approval rating on Rotten Tomatoes based on 14 reviews, with an average rating of 8.1/10. The critical consensus states: "Wynonna's back, action-packed, and dressed in black in the dynamic third season of Wynonna Earp."

In Canada, overall viewership increased 52% on Space compared to season 1 on CHCH-DT. Viewership of season 2  increased 30% compared to the first season, and made Space "the most-watched entertainment specialty channel" during the program's time slot.

In its new series review, Collider gave Wynonna Earp four stars, calling it "a fresh and familiar take on zombies, the Wild West, and gunslinger culture" and "something that also feels different to anything we're seeing on TV currently, thanks not only to its setting, but its prominent placement of so many strong, profane, kickass female characters." Digital Journal said the series was "smart" and "complex" with "a lot going for it". The A.V. Club called Melanie Scrofano "the right woman for the job ... an easy, authoritative presence"; and "when it's allowed the room to run, Wynonna Earp delights in itself," adding that the series "could grow into the good-time Western pulp it has the potential to be." In a post-season 1 review for Salon, Melanie McFarland wrote: "This modern Western proved its mettle by dint of unexpectedly weird plotting and witty dialogue ... [Melanie] Scrofano lends a hardened and slightly feral swagger to Wynonna that's vastly entertaining ... Much of the show's winning spirit rests in its exploration of family loyalty and the popular conviction that one's blood and dynastic ties compel one to fulfill a prescribed destiny."E! Entertainment Television named Wynonna Earp the "Best New Show" of 2016. It was chosen by Variety as one of the 20 best new series of 2016, stating "what this prairie-set Canadian import lacks in budget, it makes up for in gumption, sass and camaraderie." In its annual "Best of TV" highlight, Collider named Wynonna Earp the "Best New Sci-Fi" show of 2016.

Maureen Ryan of Variety named Wynonna Earp one of the best television shows of 2017, praising its "fierce and committed performances". The New York Times recommended Wynonna Earp as one of the television series to stream on Netflix, describing it as "internal mythology [that] can be a little too involved, but the characters' motivations are always clear, and the snarky dialogue is fun".

"Wayhaught", the portmanteau for the relationship between Waverly Earp and Nicole Haught, was considered one of the favorite 2017 fan "ships" on Tumblr, and the series was praised for how it is portrayed and acknowledged by Dominique Provost-Chalkley and Katherine Barrell.

Media informationWynonna Earp producers and cast members appeared at the Calgary International Film Festival on September 30, 2017, in a special program showcasing film and television productions in Alberta, Canada. The event was live-streamed and featured behind-the-scenes stories, insights, and a Q&A session.

Awards and nominations
Aurora Awards

Canadian Screen Awards

Dragon Awards

GLAAD Media Award

People's Choice Awards

Rockie Awards

Rosie Awards

WGC Screenwriting Awards

Contests
Canadian Screen Awards: Audience Award

E! Online

PopularityWynonna Earps fan base is credited with increasing the series' presence on social media and benefitting Syfy's "It's a Fan Thing" marketing campaign for niche audiences.

In response to reportage that season 4 was jeopardized due to financial complications on the part of IDW, dedicated fans began a social media campaign to save the series, including electronic billboards in Times Square promoting Wynonna Earp. In appreciation of their campaign, Melanie Scrofano sponsored a billboard thanking fans for their support.

See also
 Ghost Town Jonah Hex''
 Weird West
 List of English-language Canadian television series
 List of science fiction TV and radio shows produced in Canada
 List of fantasy television programs
 List of dramatic television series with LGBT characters: 2010s
 List of LGBT characters in television and radio

Notes

References

Further reading

External links
 
 
  Wynonna Earp at Space (archive)
  Wynonna Earp at CHCH-DT (2016 archive)
  Wynonna Earp at CHCH-DT (2017 archive)
 Wynonna Earp at SEVEN24 Films
  Wynonna Earp at IDW Entertainment
  Wynonna Earp Character Guide at Syfy
  Wynonna Earp Purgatory Case Files at Syfy
 
 
  Wynonna Earp – Comic Creator Beau Smith. GeekWorldRadio interview, YouTube
 
 

2016 American television series debuts
2016 Canadian television series debuts
2021 American television series endings
2021 Canadian television series endings
2010s American horror television series
2010s American LGBT-related drama television series
2010s American science fiction television series
2010s American supernatural television series
2010s Canadian LGBT-related drama television series
2010s Canadian science fiction television series
American action television series
American fantasy television series
Canadian fantasy television series
Canadian horror fiction television series
Canadian supernatural television series
Cultural depictions of Doc Holliday
Cultural depictions of Wyatt Earp
Dark fantasy television series
Demons in television
English-language television shows
Fantasy Westerns
Horror Westerns
Lesbian-related television shows
Fiction about purgatory
Science fiction Westerns
United States Marshals Service in fiction
Television productions suspended due to the COVID-19 pandemic
Television shows based on comics
Television shows filmed in Alberta
Television shows filmed in Calgary
Television series by Cineflix
IDW Publishing adaptations
Television series based on Image Comics
CTV Sci-Fi Channel original programming
Syfy original programming